Erratomyces is a genus of fungi in the Tilletiaceae family.

References

External links
Erratomyces at Index Fungorum

Ustilaginomycotina